Bowling competitions at the 2023 Pan American Games in Santiago, Chile are scheduled to be held at the Bowling Centre located in La Florida between November 2 and 5, 2023.

Four medal events are scheduled to be contested, a singles and doubles events for each men and women.

Qualification

A total of 50 bowlers will qualify to compete. Each nation may enter a maximum of 4 athletes (two per gender). The champions of the Cali 2021 Junior Pan American Games will only be able to compete in the individual events of the Santiago 2023 Pan American Games. If the athletes who qualified at the Cali 2021 Junior Pan American Games do not participate in the Santiago 2023 Pan American Games, said place will be forfeited and cannot be transferred to another NOC or athlete. Qualified athletes at the Cali 2021 Junior Pan American Games will not be able to obtain another slot for their NOC; however, another athlete may compete for another slot through the Santiago 2023 qualification system within the maximum quota per NOC. In each gender there will be a total of 12 pairs qualified, with one spot per event (so a total of four bowlers) reserved for the host nation Chile. There will be a total of four qualification events. Each nation could only enter two qualification events per gender.

Participating nations
A total of 10 countries qualified bowlers. The number of athletes a nation entered is in parentheses beside the name of the country.

Medal summary

Medalists

References

 
Events at the 2023 Pan American Games
2023
2023 in bowling